Andy Russo (born May 26, 1948) is a former college basketball coach at Louisiana Tech and at Washington. He compiled a 60–61 record through four seasons at Washington, and resigned at the end of the 1988-89 season after he led the Huskies to a pair of NCAA post season appearances and one NIT tournament during his tenure. Russo enjoyed greater success at Louisiana Tech. In 1983, Russo's Bulldogs team ended Lamar University's home game winning streak, thus earning the university's first NCAA men's bid to the "Big Dance." During the 1984 season, Louisiana Tech went 29–3, and had the best season in school history. His overall record at Louisiana Tech was 122–55.

As a collegiate player, Russo co-captained the Lake Forest College basketball team in 1970 with Mike Maiman.

Head coaching record

References

External links
 Andy Russo Information

1948 births
Living people
American expatriate basketball people in Italy
American men's basketball coaches
Florida Tech Panthers men's basketball coaches
Junior college men's basketball coaches in the United States
Lake Forest Foresters men's basketball players
Louisiana Tech Bulldogs basketball coaches
Lynn Fighting Knights men's basketball coaches
Place of birth missing (living people)
Reyer Venezia coaches
Washington Huskies men's basketball coaches
American men's basketball players